Irayiran Chiriyan, known as Kulacekara Nampi, was a 13th-century Indian Ocean merchant magnate from Kodungallur in the present-day Kerala. He was probably a member of the Indian merchant guild Nanadesikal (Ayyavole Ainutruvar).

He is known for his donations to a Vishnu temple at Myingpagan, a mile south of Pagan, Myanmar.

Pagan Inscription of Irayiran Chiriyan

 Originally part of a Vishu tempe in Pagan.
Engraved on a sandstone.
 Now preserved at National Museum, Pagan.
 Discovered by A. T. Arundel, CSI.
Impression by Taw Sein Ko.
Language: Tamil (Tamil script).

The Tamil portion is prefaced by a Sanskrit sloka (Grantha) from verse 6, Mukundamala (referring to the intense devotion of the towards Vishnu).

References

Businesspeople from Kerala
Kerala diaspora
Medieval Kerala
Malayali people
13th-century businesspeople